Liudmyla Vypyrailo (born 19 July 1979) is a Ukrainian cyclist. She competed in the women's points race at the 2004 Summer Olympics.

References

External links
 

1979 births
Living people
Greek female cyclists
Olympic cyclists of Ukraine
Cyclists at the 2004 Summer Olympics
Sportspeople from Simferopol